Murder Inc. was an American East Coast hip hop supergroup, formed by New York record executive Irv Gotti in 1995.
The trio was composed of three of the most prominent rappers in the music industry at the time, Jay-Z, DMX, and Ja Rule. The trio first appeared on fellow New York-based rapper Mic Geronimo's song "Time to Build". The trio went on to appear on the cover of the June 1999 issue of American hip-hop magazine XXL. 

Albeit short-lived, "Murder Inc." was rebranded by Irv Gotti in a namesake record label that he co-founded in 1998, in which Ja Rule was signed.

History
In 1987, DJ Irv Gotti met Jay-Z and the two ran around London together while Jaz-O was recording his debut album Word to the Jaz. Irv would later remark: "I knew Jay was different and special from then". In 1988, Irv met DMX through his relationship with Jay-Z and Jaz-O, as they went on tour with Main Source and The U.M.C.'s. Irv shared a room with a guy named Dr. Ceuss, who saw his love for Hip-Hop and told him he should work with DMX and this crew out in Yonkers called Ruff Ryders. Irv convinced Ruff Ryders co-founder Waah Dean to buy him a drum machine to produce tracks for DMX. Irv would later say, "First time I heard X rhyme, blew me away, his energy & rawness, knew he was different and special." In 1993, Irv met Ja Rule through  Chris Black, who was "a straight hustler." At the time, Ja and Chris were members of the group Cash Money Click, with O-1 as the third member. Irv said, "As soon as I met Ja and heard him spit, he immediately stood out from the pack".

Irv and Ja would become like brothers, as Ja would go everywhere with Irv, traveling to Yonkers to hang out with DMX and the Ruff Ryders, or meeting up with Jay-Z whenever Irv could. With little success, Irv continued to promote them all, putting out "Make A Move" with DMX at Sony Music, and "4 My Click" with Ja and the Cash Money Click at TVT Records/Blunt Records. In 1995, Jay-Z brought Damon Dash and Biggs to the studio and announced that they were his partners at Roc-A-Fella Records, asking Irv to help them. After Jay-Z recorded his debut album Reasonable Doubt, Irv brought "Ain't No Nigga" to Funkmaster Flex, and informed him of the Roc-A-Fella movement. Flex responded by playing the record on radio that night. Due to  his involvement with Roc-A-Fella, Irv was then hired by Lyor Cohen to work at Def Jam Recordings. During Irv's first meeting with the label, he announced his plan to sign DMX, and was laughed at by record executives. 

A few months later, Irv quit Def Jam because they refused to sign DMX. He was asked to return by Lyor, who told the A&R department, which included James Jones and Tina Davis, that Irv was to answer to him and Kevin Liles only. Irv immediately took Lyor, Liles and Damon Dash to Yonkers to visit the Ruff Ryders studio. When they arrived, The Lox, Drag-On and others were  freestyling, as was DMX, with his jaws wired shut. Following their departure from the studio, Lyor, who was giddy with excitement, said "We have the pick of the litter." DMX immediately received an offer from Def Jam and after signing, began recording his debut album It's Dark and Hell Is Hot. Irv then brought "Get at Me Dog" to Funkmaster Flex, and explained who DMX and the Ruff Ryders were.

During this time, Ja Rule was stuck at TVT Records/Blunt Records with Steve Gottlieb, but Irv convinced Lyor to get Ja out of his contract and sign him to Def Jam. David McPherson, an executive at Sony Music, called Irv and set up a meeting, hoping to persuade Irv to produce for him. During the meeting, McPherson said: "I see what you're doing over there at Def Jam with Jay and X, and I am here on behalf of Tommy Mottola, we want to offer you a label deal". This offer forced Lyor's hand, and Def Jam co-founder Russell Simmons gifted Irv $3 million to start his own label, Murder Inc. Records. To solidify Murder Inc., Irv had Ja Rule record his debut album Venni Vetti Vecci, and gave the song "Holla Holla" to Funkmaster Flex. Irv also put together a supergroup called Murder Inc., which consisted of DMX, Jay-Z, and Ja Rule. The trio appeared on the June 1999 front and back cover of XXL magazine. Due to issues between Jay-Z and DMX, and the disdain that arose after their freestyle battle in the 1990s, an album never materialized, though the trio did record six tracks together.

Discography

See also
 East Coast hip hop
 List of East Coast hip hop artists
 List of musical supergroups

References

Further reading
 Hip-Hop Gem: Murder Inc. Was Supposed To Be A Hip-Hop Supergroup. Stopthebreaks.com. Retrieved July 12, 2021
 Irv Gotti Explains How Jay Z, DMX and Ja Rule Got Their Record Deals. XXL. Retrieved July 12, 2021
 Ja Rule says supergroup with Jay-Z and DMX was “like pulling teeth” to get done. NME. Retrieved July 12, 2021
 Ja Rule reveals why he’s “happy” supergroup with DMX and JAY-Z failed. Revolt. Retrieved July 12, 2021
DMX Was Almost Part of a Supergroup With Jay-Z and Ja Rule. CheatSheet. Retrieved December 28, 2021
Jay-Z with DMX and Ja Rule: Murder Inc. Hip Hop News Journal. Retrieved May 2, 2021
DJ Khaled Brought Together the Jay Z, Ja Rule, and DMX Supergroup That Never Was. Complex. Retrieved December 28, 2021
JAY-Z AND DMX 'DID NOT LIKE EACH OTHER,' IRV GOTTI SAYS. MTV. Retrieved December 28, 2021
JAY Z, DMX AND JA RULE COULD'VE HAD THE GREATEST RAP GROUP OF ALL TIME. MTV. Retrieved December 28, 2021
Murder Inc.: The Supergroup That Never Was. The Passion of Christopher Pierznik. Retrieved May 28, 2021
JA RULE RECALLS JAY-Z & DMX MURDER INC. SUPERGROUP FAILING — MUCH TO HIS BENEFIT. HipHopDX. Retrieved December 28, 2021
DMX's past feuds: How rapper's beef with Jay Z and Ja Rule shattered their dreams of Murder Inc. Meaww. Retrieved December 28, 2021
Ja Rule explains why group with Jay-Z and DMX didn’t happen and his own career path, with Geto Boys [VIDEO]. Hip-HopVibe.com. Retrieved December 28, 2021
JA RULE, DMX & JAY Z ONCE PLANNED TO FORM A SUPERGROUP. The Source. Retrieved December 28, 2021
JAY Z & KENDRICK JOIN BEYONCE; MURDER INC. REUNITES. RapRadar. Retrieved December 28, 2021
EXCLUSIVE: Flashback: Ja Rule on Forming "Murder Inc" Supergroup with Jay Z & DMX. VladTV. Retrieved May 28, 2021
(Comp) JAY-Z, DMX & JA RULE - "Introducing Murder Inc. '95-'99". The Lost Tapes. Retrieved December 28, 2021

Hip hop supergroups
Gangsta rap groups
Musical groups established in 1995
Musical groups disestablished in 2000
1995 establishments in New York City
2000 disestablishments in New York (state)
East Coast hip hop groups
Jay-Z
DMX (rapper)
Hip hop groups from New York City